L Army Corps (L. Armeekorps) was a corps in the German Army during World War II.

Commanders

 General der Kavallerie (Lieutenant General) Georg Lindemann, 1 October 1940 – 19 January 1942
 General der Kavallerie (Lieutenant General) Philipp Kleffel, 19 January 1942 – 3 March 1942
 General der Infanterie (Lieutenant General) Herbert von Böckmann, 3 March 1942 – 20 July 1942
 General der Kavallerie (Lieutenant General) Philipp Kleffel, 20 July 1942 – 17 September 1943
 General der Infanterie (Lieutenant General) Wilhelm Wegener, 17 September 1943 – 24 September 1944
 Generalleutnant (Major General) Hans Boeckh-Behrens, 24 September 1944 – 24 October 1944
 General der Gebirgstruppe (Lieutenant General) Friedrich-Jobst Volckamer von Kirchensittenbach, 25 October 1944 – 11 April 1945
 Generalleutnant (Major General) Erpo Freiherr von Bodenhausen, 12 April 1945 – 8 May 1945

Area of operations
 Germany – October 1940 – April 1941
 Balkans – April 1941 – June 1941
 Eastern Front, northern sector  – June 1941 – October 1944
 Kurland pocket – October 1944 – May 1945

See also
 List of German corps in World War II

External links

Army,50
Military units and formations established in 1940
Military units and formations disestablished in 1945